Torbjørnskjær Lighthouse is a fully automated coastal lighthouse situated on a skerry in the archipelago municipality of Hvaler, Norway. It marks the east side of the entrance to the Oslofjord, with Færder marking the west. The light is powered by solar power. Landing conditions are very difficult, and nowadays service calls are made via helicopter. The lighthouse and surrounding buildings, which include residences, outhouse, a well, and engine house are proposed protected as a national park.

See also
 List of lighthouses in Norway
 Lighthouses in Norway

References

External links
 Norsk Fyrhistorisk Forening 

Hvaler
Lighthouses completed in 1872
Lighthouses in Viken